The Island of Dr. Moreau is a 1977 American science fiction horror film directed by Don Taylor, the second English-language adaptation of H. G. Wells' 1896 novel of the same name, following Island of Lost Souls (1932).

Starring Burt Lancaster, Michael York, Nigel Davenport, Barbara Carrera and Richard Basehart, the plot follows a scientist who attempts to convert animals into human beings. The make-up for the "Humanimals" characters was created by John Chambers.

Plot
Ship's engineer Andrew Braddock (Michael York) and two other men are floating in a lifeboat in the middle of the Pacific Ocean following the wreck of the ship Lady Vain. One dies at sea. After seventeen days at sea, Braddock and the other man land on an island, where the other man accompanying Braddock is promptly killed by animals. Braddock is nursed back to health in the compound governed by the mysterious scientist "Dr. Moreau" (Burt Lancaster). Besides Moreau, the inhabitants of the compound include Moreau's associate, Montgomery (Nigel Davenport), a mercenary; Moreau's mute, misshapen servant, M'Ling (Nick Cravat); and a ravishing young woman named Maria (Barbara Carrera). Moreau warns Braddock not to leave the compound at night.

Moreau welcomes Braddock as an honored guest and willingly shares his fine library, but there are some strange goings-on. One day, Braddock witnesses Moreau and Montgomery manhandling a chained creature who is clearly not quite human, and the island is home to more than just this one. The Sayer of the Law (Richard Basehart) recites the laws Moreau passed on to them. Moreau explains that they are, in fact, the hybrid products of his experiments upon various species of wild animal. Braddock is both shocked and curious. Moreau explains that he is injecting the animals with a serum containing human genetic material. At times, the human/animal hybrids still have their animal instincts and do not quite behave like a human. This sometimes enrages Moreau, who is left feeling that his experiments have not worked successfully. That night as Braddock is reeling from learning the truth, Maria goes to his room where they have sex. It is implied that this is intended by Moreau.

The following day, Braddock takes a rifle and leaves the compound, determined to see exactly how the hybrid creatures live. He enters a cave and finds several of them (all male). Just as he is surrounded by them and about to use the rifle to defend himself, Moreau appears and restores order. The Sayer of the Law is the only one of Moreau's experimental beasts who can speak. Moreau calls on him to utter the three laws (no going around on all fours, no eating of human flesh, and no taking of other life) aloud to the other creatures. This reminds them that they must not attack Braddock.

After the Bull-Man (Bob Ozman) kills a tiger, Moreau intends to take it to the "house of pain", his laboratory, as punishment. The Bull-Man panics and runs. Braddock finds it in the jungle, badly injured, where it begs him to kill it rather than return it to the lab. Braddock shoots it. This has the effect of angering the man-beasts as Braddock has broken the law of killing.

Convinced that Moreau is insane, Braddock prepares to leave the island with Maria. Moreau stops them and straps Braddock to the table in his lab. He then injects him with another serum so that he can hear Braddock describe the experience of becoming animalistic. Caged, Braddock struggles to maintain his humanity. When Montgomery objects to this treatment and threatens Moreau's life, Moreau shoots him.

Outside the compound, the angry man-beasts turn on Moreau because by killing Montgomery, he has broken the very law he expected them to follow. Moreau is mortally wounded at the compound's gate while trying to whip his attackers into submission. The man-beasts, now overpowered by their primitive instincts, go on a rampage to try and break into the compound and destroy the house of pain as the Sayer of the Law states "There is no law".

Braddock (still struggling to remain human), Maria, M'Ling, and the still-coherent and benign beastfolk servant women stave them off. Braddock resists killing Moreau, who dies of his injuries. Braddock uses the corpse as a diversion so they can escape through the compound. Eventually, the man-beasts break in and the compound is burned. In the chaos, the wild animals which Moreau kept for his experiments are turned loose and a battle ensues between them and the hybrids. Most of the man-beasts are killed by the animals or consumed by the fire, the Sayer of the Law's throat torn out by a tiger, the Bear-Man tackled off a roof by a black panther, and the Lion-Man is mauled by a normal lion. During the final escape, M'Ling risks his life to save his companions from a lion and both fall into a pit trap.

Braddock and Maria manage to float away in the lifeboat that Braddock arrived in, but are followed by the Hyena-Man (Fumio Demura) who is one of the last man-beasts. After a battle with each other, Braddock kills the Hyena-Man with a broken oar. Sometime later, they see a passing ship, and the serum has worn off, returning Braddock to his full human state as Maria looks on with changed, feline eyes.

Cast
 Burt Lancaster as Dr. Paul Moreau
 Michael York as Andrew Braddock
 Nigel Davenport as Montgomery
 Barbara Carrera as Maria
 Richard Basehart as Sayer of the Law
 Nick Cravat as M'Ling
 The Great John L. as Boar-Man
 Bob Ozman as Bull-Man
 Fumio Demura as Hyena-Man
 Gary Baxley as Lion-Man
 John Gillespie as Tiger-Man
 David Cass as Bear-Man

Production
The film was second in American International Pictures' H. G. Wells film cycle, following The Food of the Gods (1976) and preceding Empire of the Ants (1977).

Filming took place in Saint Croix, U.S. Virgin Islands.

Lancaster has been described as perfectly matching Wells' description of Moreau's physical appearance, unlike the other two actors to play the role on screen, Charles Laughton in Island of Lost Souls (1932) and Marlon Brando in The Island of Dr. Moreau (1996), both of whom were portly and had receding hair.

Carrera claims there were three or four different endings imagined, including one in which her character gave birth to a kitten. That version was favored by producer John Temple-Smith, which York flatly refused to do. Director Taylor said that he did not take it seriously and the footage was never shot.

A comic-book adaptation was released by Marvel Comics the same year. Written by Doug Moench and illustrated by Larry Hama, the comic-book adaptation had a slightly less happy ending than the film, with Maria reverting into a cat-woman just before help arrives.

Release
The Island of Dr. Moreau premiered on 13 July 1977 in the United States. Lorber Films released the film under its Kino Lorber Studio Classics imprint available for the first time on Blu-ray in the U.S.

Critical reception

On review aggregator Rotten Tomatoes, The Island of Dr. Moreau holds an approval rating of 54%, based on 24 reviews, and an average rating of 5.1/10. Its consensus reads: "The Island of Dr. Moreau takes a reasonably entertaining pass at adapting its classic source material, although key scenes are let down by struggles with special effects".

See also
The other film versions of the novel:
 Island of Lost Souls (1932) starring Charles Laughton and Bela Lugosi.
 The Island of Dr. Moreau (1996) starring Marlon Brando and Val Kilmer. This was the least commercially and critically successful adaptation of the three with a notorious production history. This 1996 film would spawn a documentary called Lost Soul: The Doomed Journey of Richard Stanley's Island of Dr. Moreau (2014), documenting the film's turbulent production.

Notes

References

External links
 
 
 
 

1977 films
1977 horror films
1970s monster movies
1970s science fiction adventure films
1970s science fiction horror films
American International Pictures films
American science fiction adventure films
American science fiction horror films
American monster movies
Adventure horror films
Films set on islands
Films set on fictional islands
Films adapted into comics
Films based on works by H. G. Wells
Films directed by Don Taylor
Films scored by Laurence Rosenthal
Films shot in the United States Virgin Islands
Films about genetic engineering
The Island of Doctor Moreau
Mad scientist films
1970s English-language films
1970s American films